Coelorinchus longissimus is a species of rattail; this deep-water fish is found in the waters around Taiwan and southern Japan.

This elongated fish grows to a length of about 36 cm. It has a large head with oval eyes and a small inferior mouth with conical teeth. It has a long bioluminescent organ in front of the anus.

References

A new species, Caelorinchus sheni, and 19 new records of grenadiers (Pisces: Gadiformes: Macrouridae) from Taiwan - CHIOU Mei-Luen ; SHAO Kwang-Tsao ; IWAMOTO Tomio

Macrouridae
Fish described in 1943
Taxa named by Kiyomatsu Matsubara